Military Police (also known as PM) are the preventive state police of the states and of the Federal District of Brazil. The Military Police units are the main ostensive police force at the state level and are responsible for policing and maintaining the public order. Their formations, rules and uniforms vary depending on the state. Investigative work and forensics are undertaken by the Civil Police of each state.

All state Military Police and Military Firefighters Corps are classed as reserve troops and ancillary forces of the Brazilian Army. In time of war (or other emergencies) the military police forces can be pressed into federal service. But they remain distinct from the provosts belonging to the other services within the Brazilian Military: the corps Army Police for the Army, Police Company of the Naval Battalion (Companhia de Polícia do Batalhão Naval) for the Navy, and Air Force Police for the Air Force.

In 2004 the National Public Security Force was created to handle major security crisis. The unit, which is composed of the most qualified Military Police personnel from all federal states, can only be deployed through the express command of a state governor.

History 
The first militarized police in Portugal (when Brazil was still a colony) was the Royal Police Guard of Lisbon, established in 1801; which was followed by the model of the National Gendarmerie of France, created in 1791.

When the Portuguese Royal Family was transferred to Brazil, the Royal Police Guard of Lisbon remained in Portugal, and another equivalent was created in Rio de Janeiro, under the name of Military Division of the Royal Guard Police of Rio de Janeiro, in 1809.

With the abdication of Emperor Pedro I in 1831, the Regency held reformulations on the Brazilian Armed Forces. The Royal Guard Police of Rio de Janeiro was abolished, and replaced by the Municipal Guard Corps of Volunteers; a type of security force similar to the French National Guard. The same law allowed each province to establish its own Guard of Volunteers.

In 1834 Pedro I died in Portugal and this reduced the fear in Brazil of a reunification of the kingdoms. The Guard of Volunteers were then transformed into Province Police Corps, with professional troops. The Police Corps were created with the same structure as the Army, and to serve as reserve troops when necessary.

With the Proclamation of the Republic, Brazil adopted a constitution based on the United States' one, where the federal states have a large amount of autonomy. The Corps of Police began to be administered by the states and became smaller regional armies, with infantry, cavalry, artillery, and later, even air forces. This danger to national security remained until the end of World War II, with the deposition of the dictatorial government of Getúlio Vargas.

After World War II, the Military Police assumed the roles of a more "traditional" police force, similar to a gendarmerie subject to the states. It sought a rapprochement with the civil society, slowly developing the configuration it currently possesses.

Structure

Organization
The Secretariat for Public Security (Secretaria de Segurança Pública—SSP) supervises all state police activities. The SSPs are subordinate to the National Council of Public Security (Conselho Nacional de Segurança Pública - CONASP).

According to Article 144 of the federal constitution, the function of the Military Police "is to serve as a conspicuous police force and to preserve public order." The Military Police of any state are organized as a military force and have a military-based rank structure. Training is weighted more heavily toward police matters, but counterinsurgency training is also included. Arms and equipment of state forces include machine guns and armored cars, in addition to other items generally associated with police.

Article 144 of the constitution stipulates that: "The Military Police forces and the Military Firefighters Corps, ancillary forces and army reserve, are subordinate, along with the Civil Police forces, to the governors of the states, Federal District, and territories." Between 1969 and 1985, the Ministry of Army has controlled the Military Police during periods of declared national emergency. Before 1930 these forces were under individual state control, and known as "the governors' armies." They sometimes outnumbered regular troops in many states. In 1932, after Constitutionalist Revolution in São Paulo, the Federal Army took steps to reverse this situation. In 1964 most Military Police members were on the side of the successful conspirators.

During military dictatorship, Military Police units were often commanded by active-duty army officers, but that has occurred less frequently as professional police officers have achieved higher ranks and positions. The commandant of a state's Military Police is usually a Colonel. The command is divided into police regions, which deploy police battalions and companies. Firefighting is also a Military Police function in some states, but they are organized in separate units called Corpo de Bombeiros Militar. State traffic police are either the State Highway Police (Polícia Rodoviária Estadual), or the Traffic Police (Polícia de Trânsito) in the larger cities. Both are part of the state Military Police.

Field organization
The Military Police is organized into battalions, companies, platoons, and subdivided into detachments. The battalions are based in major urban centers, and their companies and platoons are distributed according to population density in cities.

The mounted police is organized into regiments, subdivided into squadrons and platoons of mounted police.

Nomenclature
Throughout Brazil the Military Police is known by the acronym PM (for Policia Militar), followed by the abbreviation of the State, except in the State of Rio Grande do Sul, where the unit is known as BM (for Brigada Militar, "Military Brigade").

 01 . PMAC - Acre
 02 . PMAL - Alagoas
 03 . PMAP - Amapá
 04 . PMAM - Amazonas
 05 . PMBA - Bahia
 06 . PMCE - Ceará
 07 . PMDF - Distrito Federal
 08 . PMES - Espírito Santo
 09 . PMGO - Goiás
 10 . PMMA - Maranhão
 11 . PMMT - Mato Grosso
 12 . PMMS - Mato Grosso do Sul
 13 . PMMG - Minas Gerais
 14 . PMPA - Pará
 15 . PMPB - Paraíba
 16 . PMPR - Paraná
 17 . PMPE - Pernambuco
 18 . PMPI - Piauí
 19 . PMERJ -Rio de Janeiro
 20 . PMRN - Rio Grande do Norte
 21 . BMRS - Rio Grande do Sul
 22 . PMRO - Rondônia
 23 . PMRR - Roraima
 24 . PMSC - Santa Catarina
 25 . PMESP- São Paulo
 26 . PMSE - Sergipe
 27 . PMTO - Tocantins

These forces are distinct from the three provost forces that police the Brazilian armed forces:
The Naval Battalion Police Company
Army Police
Aeronautical Police

Uniforms

The Brazilian Armed Forces inherited Portuguese military traditions and during the period of the Empire and part of the Republic, with few exceptions, dark blue uniforms were used.
In 1903 the Brazilian Army opted for khaki colored field uniforms, later copied by the Military Police. In 1934 the Ministry of War established khaki as the color khaki for all reserve forces.

After the Second World War, the Military Police had the autonomy to adopt its own uniforms, but most stayed with the khaki. During the Military Government in 1976, the Army suggested that the Military Police adopt the blue color (color of the uniform of the Military Police of the Federal District). Since then, some units have changed their uniforms while others have not.

Currently the color khaki (with variations to beige) and blue (with variations of gray to dark blue) prevail in the colors of the uniforms of the Military Police.

 Forces with khaki uniforms (includes green)
BMRS, PMAC, PMAL, PMBA, PMCE, PMGO, PMMG, PMPB, PMPR, PMPE, PMPI, PMSC, PMPA and PMTO.

 Forces with blue uniforms (includes Blue-grey)
PMAP, PMAM, PMDF, PMES, PMMA, PMMS, PMERJ, PMRN, PMRO, PMRR, PMESP,  PMMT and PMSE.

This applies only to service uniforms, not to the formal uniform, which has different variations.

Ranks 
The Military Police of the Brazilian States have almost the same hierarchical ranking system of the Brazilian Army, but with different insignias and with no rank of "general".
Officers

Enlisted

Main types of policing 

 Aerial patrol
 Environmental police
 K-9
 Riot control police
 Prison security
 Urban traffic police
 School patrol
 Police bicycle
 Police motorcycle
 Mounted police
 Highway patrol
 Railroad police
 Special operations
 D.A.R.E.
 Tourist police

Ratio of Military Police to Population

Analysis by the Federal Government of the ratio of resident population to the number of official Military Police in 2003 shows that the proportion is quite varied among the states. The states of Roraima, Amapá, Acre, Rondônia, Rio Grande do Norte and Rio de Janeiro, plus the Federal District have a higher proportion of Military Police. In the Federal District, for example, for each military police there are one hundred and thirty-seven inhabitants.
 
At the opposite extreme, the states with the lowest ratio of military police are Pará, Maranhão, Piauí, Ceará, Mato Grosso do Sul, Paraná and Rio Grande do Sul. Maranhão has the lowest, with eight hundred and twenty-two people per Military Police.

Note that in the case of São Paulo and Paraná the numbers of the Military Firefighters Corps are included in the figures for Military Police.

National Public Security Force

In situations of serious disturbance of public order that exceeds the capacity of the States, their Governors can request assistance from the Federal Government.

To work in such situations, the Ministry of Justice has the National Public Security Force (FNSP), a national gendarmeire composed of selected MP personnel and constables from state military police commands.

The FNSP is composed of specially trained officers and other ranks of the Military Police of different States, in coordination between the Secretary of Public Safety of each State and the Ministry of Justice.

Inspectorate General of Military Police

The Inspectorate General of Military Police - IGPM is a command element of the Brazilian Army, responsible for coordinating and conducting activities of control over the Military Police and Military Firefighters Corps of States.It is part of the Land Operations Command - COTER and its mission is:
 The establishment of principles, guidelines and standards for the effective implementation of control and coordination of the Military Police under Command of the Army, through its Military Area Commands, Regions and other Major Military Command;
 The control of the organization and legislation, personnel and equipment of military police, such as:
Weapons, ammunition, communications equipment, chemical agents, military equipment, vehicles, aircraft and boats.
 Collaboration in studies aiming to rights, justice and guarantees of the Military Police, and the establishment of conditions for convening and mobilization;
 Coordinating and monitoring compliance with the provisions of relevant State and Federal Legislation;
 Conduct regular inspections.

Equipment

Photo gallery current Brazilian Military Police cars

Armored vehicles

Helicopters

Gallery

See also 
 Brazilian Armed Forces
 Military Police (Provost)
 Military Firefighters Corps
 Gendarmerie
 United States National Guard 
 State defense forces

References

Sources 

  Em Nome da Ordem: a constituição de aparatos policiais no universo luso-brasileiro (séculos XVIII e XIX) ; Regina Helena Martins de Faria; Universidade Federal de Pernambuco (UFPE) - Recife; 2007. (texto em pdf.)
A Polícia Militar de Mato Grosso - História e Evolução, 1835 a 1985; Ubaldo Monteiro.
Crônica da Brigada Militar Gaúcha; Hélio Moro Mariante; edição da Imprensa Official; 1972.
História da Polícia Militar de Pernambuco; Major Roberto Monteiro.
História do Batalhão de Segurança - A Polícia Militar do Rio Grande do Norte, de 1834 a 1968; Romulo C. Wanderley; edição Walter Pereira S.A. / A Livraria e Papelaria; 1969.
 Episódios da História da PMPR - Volume I ao VII; Capitão João Alves da Rosa Filho; edição da Associação da Vila Militar; 2000.
Origens Históricas da Polícia Militar de Minas Gerais - volumes 1 e 2; Coronel Paulo René de Andrade; edição da Imprensa Official de Minas Gerais; 1985.
Raízes do Militarismo Paulista; Coronel Edilberto de Oliveira Melo; edição da Imprensa Official; 1982.
Soldados da Pátria, História do Exército Brasileiro 1889 - 1937; Frank D. McCann; Edição da Companhia de Letras; 2007.
Tropas Paulistas de Outrora; J. Wasth Rodrigues; edição do Governo do Estado de São Paulo; 1978.

Defence agencies of Brazil
 
Gendarmerie
State law enforcement agencies of Brazil